Bettles Airport  is a state-owned public-use airport located in Bettles, a city in the Yukon-Koyukuk Census Area of the U.S. state of Alaska.

Facilities and aircraft 
Bettles Airport covers 1,195 acres  which contains one runway designated 1/19 with a 5,190 x 150 ft (1,582 x 46 m) gravel surface. It also has two seaplane landing areas: 9W/27W which measures 1,500 x 1,200 ft (457 x 366 m) and 18W/36W which measures 2,000 x 1,200 ft (610 x 366 m).

For the 12-month period ending December 31, 2005, the airport had 4,150 aircraft operations, an average of 11 per day: 72% general aviation, 24% air taxi and 4% military. There are 11 aircraft based at this airport: 91% single-engine and 9% multi-engine.

Airlines and destinations 

The following airlines offer scheduled passenger service at this airport:

Statistics

Incidents 
On October 30, 1970, Douglas C-47B N99663 of Frontier Flying Service was written off in a landing accident. The aircraft struck three parked aircraft. It was on a cargo flight from Fairbanks International Airport, Alaska, to Ambler Airport, Alaska via Bettles. All four aircraft were substantially damaged.

References

External links
 FAA Alaska airport diagram (GIF)
 

Airports in the Arctic
Airports in the Yukon–Koyukuk Census Area, Alaska